Navreh or Kashmiri New Year is the celebration of the first day of the Kashmiri new year by Kashmiri Hindus, with the largest Kashmiri Hindu community being the Kashmiri Pandits. Kashmiri Pandits dedicate Navreh festival to their Goddess Sharika and pay homage to her during the festival. It takes place on the first day of the bright half (Shukla Paksha) on the month of Chaitra (March–April) of the Kashmiri Hindu calendar

History 
It is believed that Saptarishi era of the Kashmiri Hindus started on the day of Navreh, 5079 years ago. According to legends, Mother Goddess Sharika's dwelling was on Sharika Parabata (Hari Parabata) where celebrated Shapta Rishi gathered. It is an auspicious day as the first ray of sun fell on Chakreshwari and paid honor to her. This moment is considered the beginning of New Year and the Saptarishi era for astrologers.

Rituals 
On the eve of the new year, the priest (kulguru) of the family provides a religious almanac (nachipatra) for the next year and a scroll (kreel pach) of the local goddess. Then a customary large plate (thali) is filled with rice and offerings like almanac, scroll, dried and fresh flowers, wye herb, new grass, curd, walnuts, pen, ink container, gold and silver coins, salt, cooked rice, wheat cakes and bread and covered on the eve of Navreh. On the day of the new year, the family members gather together, uncover the thali and view it on the holy day.

The rice and coins represent our daily bread and wealth, the pen and paper a reminder of the quest for learning, the mirror represents retrospection.
The calendar signals the changing time and the Deity the Universal Constant, and they together are a reminder of the constancy of changing time. The bitter herb is reminiscent of life's bitter aspects, to be taken in stride alongside the good. The bitter herb ‘wye’ is usually eaten with walnuts to bring wholeness of life's experiences in the admixture.

Symbolism aside, the consumption of this bitter herb has also been practiced by Native American cultures as well as by some of the American transcendentalist philosophers for various reasons.

After seeing (darshan) the thali, each person takes a walnut to be thrown into a river  The walnuts from the thali are dropped in the river as a sign of thanksgiving. Then the family members offer turmeric rice in ghee (tahar) to the goddess at the temple and seek blessings.

See also 
 Kashmiri Pandits
 Kashmiri Hindus
 Kashmiri Hindu festivals

References

Further reading
 Toshkhani, S.S. (2009). Cultural Heritage of Kashmiri Pandits. Pentagon Press.
 

New Year in India
Hindu festivals
New Year celebrations
Festivals in Jammu and Kashmir
Kashmiri Hindus
Culture of Jammu and Kashmir
Hinduism in Jammu and Kashmir